A communications manager, sometimes called public relations manager or pr manager, is a person entrusted with the management (planning, implementation and controlling) of strategic, goal-oriented communication processes between organizations (companies, associations, authorities, NGOs, etc.) and their respective stakeholders.

Typical job titles for communications managers are - depending on their level - Communications manager, Communications Director, Vice President Communications and Chief Communications Officer (CCO). The activity is not to be equated with that of the press or media spokesperson, who is only responsible for communication with the media (media relations). However, the area of media relations makes up a large (but declining) area of work for communication managers.

Fields of work 
Communication managers work in commercial enterprises, government organizations/authorities, non-governmental organizations (associations and other NGOs), scientific institutions, parties and other organizations. 

The areas in which communication managers work include the following communication disciplines:
 Media relations
 Internal communications
 Marketing communications
 Public affairs (representation of interests and lobbying)
 Sales communications
 Investor relations

Typical tasks and objectives include:
 overall management of strategic communications
 the evaluation of communication activities and measurement of success (communication controlling)
 brand communications
 internal advice and training
 CSR communications

Professional associations 
Communications manager is a profession, with professional organizations on international, national and regional levels:
 European Association of Communication Directors (EACD), the professional association for senior communication managers (communication directors) in companies, headquartered in Brussels

Prominent examples 
Prominent examples of high-level communications managers include:
 the current White House Communications Director
 the current Downing Street Director of Communications to the Prime Minister of the United Kingdom

Weblinks 
 Zerfass, A., Verhoeven, P., Moreno, A., Tench, R., & Verčič, D. (2020). European Communication Monitor 2020. Ethical challenges, gender issues, cyber security, and competence gaps in strategic communication. Results of a survey in 44 countries. Brussels: EUPRERA/EACD. Online: PDF

References 

Public relations people by role
Management occupations
Corporate titles
Communications management
Managers